Singmaster is a surname. Notable people with the surname include:

 C. F. and Mary Singmaster, owners of the C.F. and Mary Singmaster House
 David Singmaster (born 1939), British mathematician, after whom Singmaster's conjecture is named
 Elsie Singmaster (1879–1958), American writer

See also 

 Songmaster